Goulburn is a surname, and may refer to:

 Frederick Goulburn (1788–1837), British army officer and politician; brother of Henry Goulburn and uncle of Meyrick Goulburn
 Henry Goulburn (1784–1856), British politician and slave owner; brother of Frederick Goulburn and uncle of Meyrick Goulburn
 Meyrick Goulburn (1818–1897), English churchman, dean, and headmaster; nephew of Frederick and Henry Goulburn